She Died Young is a 1938 thriller novel by the British writer Alan Kennington. It was published in France in 1950 translated by Maurice-Bernard Endrèbe, himself a noted writer of crime novels.

Adaptation
In 1956 the novel served as a basis for the film You Can't Escape starring Noelle Middleton, Guy Rolfe and Robert Urquhart.

References

Bibliography
 Goble, Alan. The Complete Index to Literary Sources in Film. Walter de Gruyter, 1999.

1938 British novels
British thriller novels
British mystery novels
British novels adapted into films
Novels set in England
Jarrold Publishing books
Novels by Alan Kennington